Pamela Gordon may refer to:

Pamela Gordon (actress) (1937 – 2003), American actress
Pamela Gordon (politician) (born 1955), Bermudian politician
Pamela Anne Gordon (born 1943), Canadian model